Phyllodinus is a genus of delphacid planthoppers in the family Delphacidae. There are about six described species in Phyllodinus.

Species
These six species belong to the genus Phyllodinus:
 Phyllodinus affinis (Schumacher, 1915)
 Phyllodinus albofasciatus Muir, 1929
 Phyllodinus aritainoides (Schumacher, 1915)
 Phyllodinus kotoshonis (Matsumura, 1940)
 Phyllodinus luzonensis Muir, 1916
 Phyllodinus nervatus Van Duzee, 1897

References

Further reading

 
 
 
 

Delphacinae
Articles created by Qbugbot